Kayseri Basketbol, for sponsorship reasons Bellona Kayseri Basketbol,  is a Turkish women's basketball club based in Kayseri, Turkey. The club was founded in 1986.

History
2005–2007: TED Kayseri Koleji 
2007–2011: Panküp TED Kayseri Koleji 
2011–2014: Kayseri Kaski Spor 
2014–2018: AGÜ Spor (Abdullah Gül Üniversitesi)
2018–present: Kayseri Basketbol

Current roster

Honours

European competitions
 EuroLeague Women
 Quarter-Finalists (1): 2013–14
 EuroCup Women
 Runners-up (3): 2011–12, 2012–13, 2016–17

Domestic competitions
 Turkish Women's Basketball League
 Runners-up (1): 2014–15
 Turkish Women's Basketball Cup
 Runners-up (1): 2016–17
 Turkish Women's Second Basketball League
 Winners (1): 2005–06

References

External links
 Official website 
Eurobasket.com profile
Twitter account
Instagram account

Women's basketball teams in Turkey
Sport in Kayseri
Basketball teams established in 1986
1986 establishments in Turkey